John Francis Dunleavy (September 14, 1879 – April 11, 1944) was an outfielder and pitcher in Major League Baseball. He played for the St. Louis Cardinals from 1903 to 1905. He played college baseball at Amherst College.

References

External links

1879 births
1944 deaths
Major League Baseball outfielders
Major League Baseball pitchers
St. Louis Cardinals players
Baseball players from New Jersey
Bridgeport Soubrettes players
Bridgeport Orators players
Norwich Witches players
Montreal Royals players
Indianapolis Indians players
St. Paul Saints (AA) players
Louisville Colonels (minor league) players
Amherst Mammoths baseball players
People from Harrison, New Jersey
Sportspeople from Hudson County, New Jersey